The Democrat Printing & Lithograph Co. Building is a historic commercial building at 114-122 East Second Street in Little Rock, Arkansas.  It is a roughly square brick building with limestone detailing, three stories in height, built in 1924 to a design by the architectural firm of Sanders & Ginocchio.  Its street-facing facades are articulated by brick piers with limestone caps, with plate glass windows on the first floor, groups of three sash windows on the second, and large multi-paned windows on the third.

The building was listed on the National Register of Historic Places in 1998.

See also
National Register of Historic Places listings in Little Rock, Arkansas

References

Industrial buildings and structures on the National Register of Historic Places in Arkansas
Buildings and structures completed in 1924
Buildings and structures in Little Rock, Arkansas
National Register of Historic Places in Little Rock, Arkansas